William Worthington (April 8, 1872 in Troy, New York – April 9, 1941 in Beverly Hills, California) was an American silent film actor and director.

Career
Worthington became interested in the performing arts when he began his career as an opera singer and stage actor. He entered films with a lead role in 1913, and one of his more notable films was Damon and Pythias in 1914. From 1917 to 1925, William concentrated on directing films and was the head of a film production firm called Multicolor, which was bought by Cinecolor in 1932. He was active in films up until his death in 1941.

Filmography

Actor

 The Old Clerk (1913)
 The Restless Spirit (1913, Short) as A Stranger
 The Passerby (1913, short) as Mr. Klein
 Forgotten Women (1913, short) as The Reveller
 Back to Life (1913, short) as The Gambler
 The Barrier of Bars (1913, short)
 The Dread Inheritance (1913, short) as The Doctor
 Risen from the Ashes (1914, short)
 Samson (1914) as Ladal
 Stolen Glory (1914, short) as Paul Devine
 The Woman in Black (1914, short) as Prof. M. Byrd
 The Spy (1914) as Gen. George Washington
 On the Rio Grande (1914, short) as James Russell, Anna's Father
 Prowlers of the Wild (1914, short) as John
 The Sob Sister (1914, short) as Mr. Tracy
 Circle 17 (1914, short) as Prof. Bartoli
 Through the Flames (1914, short) as Bill Hampton, Bert's Pal
 A Prince of Bavaria (1914, short) as Peter Carson, Caroline's Father
 As the Wind Blows (1914, short) as The Husband
 Kid Regan's Hands (1914, short) as Bill Sweeney
 The Vagabond (1914, short) as The Father
 The Link That Binds (1914, short) as McClain, Donald's Father
 The Chorus Girl's Thanksgiving (1914, short)
 The Opened Shutters (1914) as Thinkright Johnson
Damon and Pythias (1914) as Damon
 Called Back (1914) as Dr. Manuel Ceneri
 A Page from Life (1914, short) as Carter, Rita's Father
 The Big Sister's Christmas (1914, short) as Martin Towne
 The Flash (1915, short) as Old Carl Bauer
 Changed Lives (1915, short) as James
 The Black Box (1915, serial) as Prof. Ashleigh / Lord Ashleigh
 The Grail (1915, Short) as Griswold, Jean's Father
 Homage (1915, Short) as Abdiel O'Day, Erwin's Father
 The Great Ruby Mystery (1915, short) as Heinrich von Buclow
 The Queen of Hearts (1915, short) as Col. Phillipot
 The Reward of Chivalry (1916, short) as Minor Role (uncredited)
 A Wife at Bay (1916, short)
 Beyond the Trail (1916, short)
 High Heels (1921) as Joshua Barton
 The Green Goddess (1923) as The High Priest
 Red Lights (1923) as Luke Carson
 The Awful Truth (1925) as Jonathan Sims
 Her Honor, the Governor (1926)
 Kid Boots (1926) as Eleanor's father
 The Return of Boston Blackie (1927) as John Markham
 Good Morning, Judge (1928) as Mr. Grey Sr
 Half a Bride (1928) as Mr. Winslow
 Happiness Ahead (1928) as Mortimer Goodstone
 The Man Who Came Back (1931) as Capt. Gallon
 Finger Prints (1931) as John Mackey
 Shipmates (1931) as Adm. R.S. 'Bill' Schuyler
 The Trial of Vivienne Ware (1932) as Assistant Defense Attorney (uncredited)
 No More Orchids (1932) as Cannon (uncredited)
 The Keyhole (1933) as Extra on Ship (uncredited)
 Gabriel Over the White House (1933) as Member of Congress (uncredited)
 The Little Giant (1933) as Harry S. Ames, Cass-Winter Associate (uncredited)
 Picture Snatcher (1933) as Reporter Witnessing Execution (uncredited)
 The Silk Express (1933) as Annoyed Ship Passenger (uncredited)
 Melody Cruise (1933) as Guest at Bon Voyage Party (uncredited)
 Morning Glory (1933) as Banker, Party Guest (uncredited)
 Lady for a Day (1933) as Hotel Guest (uncredited)
 I Loved a Woman (1933) as Jefferson (uncredited)
 The Perils of Pauline (1933, serial) as American Consul [Ch. 1]
 Duck Soup (1933) as First Minister of Finance (uncredited)
 Design for Living (1933) as Theatre Patron (uncredited)
 You Can't Buy Everything (1934) as Teller (uncredited)
 Beggars in Ermine (1934) as Board Member (uncredited)
 The Gold Ghost (1934, Short) as Gloria's Father, Jim
 The World Moves On (1934) as Judge of Duel (uncredited)
 His Greatest Gamble (1934) as Dinner Guest (uncredited)
 Dames (1934) as Board Member in Show (uncredited)
 One Exciting Adventure (1934) as Man
 Tailspin Tommy (1934, Serial) as Denver Doctor [Ch. 6] (uncredited)
 The President Vanishes (1934) as Legislator
 Flirtation Walk (1934) as Civilian (scenes deleted)
 The Man Who Reclaimed His Head (1934) as Attendant (uncredited)
 Grand Old Girl (1935) as School Board Member (uncredited)
 Symphony of Living (1935) as Symphony Chairman
 A Notorious Gentleman (1935) as Minor Role (uncredited)
 Twenty Dollars a Week (1935) as Mr. Davidson
 A Night at the Ritz (1935) as Banker (uncredited)
 Cardinal Richelieu (1935) as King's Chamberlain
 Reckless (1935) as Wedding Guest (uncredited)
 The Casino Murder Case (1935) as First Bidder (uncredited)
 Public Hero No. 1 (1935) as Prison Board Member (uncredited)
 Hooray for Love (1935) as Man Nodding 'No' in Montage (uncredited)
 Love Me Forever (1935) as Bit Role (uncredited)
 Keeper of the Bees (1935) as Colonel
 Orchids to You (1935) as Judge at Flower Show (uncredited)
 Anna Karenina (1935) as Opera Spectator (uncredited)
 Diamond Jim (1935) as Man at Bar (uncredited)
 The Case of the Lucky Legs (1935) as Audience Member Next to Patton (uncredited)
 Grand Exit (1935) as Doctor (uncredited)
 In Old Kentucky (1935) as Bit (uncredited)
 If You Could Only Cook (1935) as Mr. Fletcher (uncredited)
 Magnificent Obsession (1935) as Man on Boat (uncredited)
 Dangerous Intrigue (1936) as Steel Mill Executive (uncredited)
 Champagne Charlie (1936) as Board Member (uncredited)
 The Law in Her Hands (1936) as Appellate Court judge (uncredited)
 The Crime of Dr. Forbes (1936) as Faculty Doctor (uncredited)
 The Final Hour (1936) as Judge (uncredited)
 Alibi for Murder (1936) as John J. Foster (uncredited)
 Polo Joe (1936) as Guest (uncredited)
 Can This Be Dixie? (1936) as George Washington Peachtree
 The Accusing Finger (1936) as Senator (uncredited)
 Camille (1936) as Extra in Casino (uncredited)
 Give Me Liberty (1936, Short) as Pendleton (uncredited)
 After the Thin Man (1936) as 'Respectable' Man in Car (uncredited)
 That Girl from Paris (1936) as Wedding Guest (uncredited)
 Battle of Greed (1937) as Judge William H. Avery
 Woman-Wise (1937) as Guest in Cafe (uncredited)
 The Devil's Playground (1937) as Vice Admiral (uncredited)
 Criminal Lawyer (1937) as Party Guest (uncredited)
 Man of the People (1937) as Judge (uncredited)
 The Last of Mrs. Cheyney (1937) as Extra on Ship (uncredited)
 Ready, Willing and Able (1937) as Elderly Man in Hallway (uncredited)
 Penny Wisdom (1937, Short) as Dinner Guest (uncredited)
 The Great Gambini (1937) as Elderly Man (uncredited)
 The Singing Marine (1937) as Ship Passenger (uncredited)
 Marry the Girl (1937) as George Washington (uncredited)
 Broadway Melody of 1938 (1937) as N.O. Norwich, Theatrical Agent in Montage (uncredited)
 The Footloose Heiress (1937) as Mr. Clark's Associate (uncredited)
 Music for Madame (1937) as Bus Passenger (uncredited)
 Alcatraz Island (1937) as First Trial Judge (uncredited)
 Live, Love and Learn (1937) as Mr. Killy (uncredited)
 Missing Witnesses (1937) as John - Radio Listener (uncredited)
 Hollywood Hotel (1937) as Man at Premiere (uncredited)
 Sergeant Murphy (1938) as Judge at Horse Show (uncredited)
 Walking Down Broadway (1938) as Judge (uncredited)
 Accidents Will Happen (1938) as Irate car owner getting bumped (uncredited)
 Women Are Like That (1938) as The Minister (uncredited)
 The Beloved Brat (1938) as Dr. Reynolds (uncredited)
 A Trip to Paris (1938) as Councilman (uncredited)
 Hold That Kiss (1938) as Dog Show Judge (uncredited)
 Squadron of Honor (1938) as Major (uncredited)
 The Amazing Dr. Clitterhouse (1938) as Updyke's Guest (uncredited)
 The Chaser (1938) as Dr. Matthews (uncredited)
 I Am the Law (1938) as Committee Man (uncredited)
 Boys Town (1938) as Governor (uncredited)
 The Spider's Web (1938) as Cantlon (uncredited)
 There Goes My Heart (1938) as Banker (uncredited)
 Young Dr. Kildare (1938) as Board Member (uncredited)
 The Cowboy and the Lady (1938) as Dinner Party Guest (uncredited)
 Gang Bullets (1938) as Judge (uncredited)
 Angels with Dirty Faces (1938) as Warden (uncredited)
 Sweethearts (1938) as Backstage Man at NBC Theater (uncredited)
 Homicide Bureau (1939) as Citizen League Member (uncredited)
 They Made Her a Spy (1939) as Senator in the Dome Cafe (uncredited)
 The Story of Vernon and Irene Castle (1939) as Man Reading Newspaper (uncredited)
 First Offenders (1939) as Judge (uncredited)
 Dark Victory (1939) as Specialist #1 (uncredited)
 Zenobia (1939) as Townsman (uncredited)
 Union Pacific (1939) as Oliver Ames (uncredited)
 The Girl from Mexico (1939) as Mr. Patton (uncredited)
 6,000 Enemies (1939) as Frank Jordan (uncredited)
 The Forgotten Woman (1939) as Doctor (uncredited)
 Hawaiian Nights (1939) as Man in Hotel Lobby (uncredited)
 Espionage Agent (1939) as Instructor in Montage (uncredited)
 Rio (1939) as American Banker (uncredited)
 Pride of the Blue Grass (1939) as First Steward (uncredited)
 Mr. Smith Goes to Washington (1939) as Committeeman (uncredited)
 The Oklahoma Kid (1939) as (uncredited) 
 Abe Lincoln in Illinois (1940) as Minor Role (uncredited)
 Law and Order (1940) as Judge Williams
 Blossoms in the Dust (1941) as City Councilman (uncredited)
 Joan of Ozark (1942) as Clem (uncredited) (final film role)

Director

 The Grail (1915)
 Homage (1915)
 The Gopher (1915)
 The Social Lion (1915)
 Misjudged (1915)
 The Queen of Hearts (1915)
 Her Prey (1915)
 The Fair God of Sun Island (1915)
 On the Level (1915)
 In Search of a Wife (1915)
 As the Shadows Fall (1915)
 The Reward of Chivalry (1916)
 The Family Secret (1916)
 The Dupe (1916)
 After the Play (1916)
 The Best Man's Bride (1916)
 The Mark of a Gentleman (1916)
 Darcy of the Northwest Mounted (1916)
 The Wire Pullers (1916)
 Bringing Home Father (1916)
 The Rose Colored Scarf (1916)
 The False Part (1916) 
 They Wouldn't Take Him Seriously (1916) 
 Nature Incorporated (1916)
 Lee Blount Goes Home (1916)
 Cross Purposes (1916)
 The Heart of a Show Girl (1916)
 Main 4400 (1916)
 Love Never Dies (1916)
 The Masked Woman (1916)
 A Stranger from Somewhere (1916)
 Little Partner (1916)
 Bringing Home Father (1917)
 The Devil's Pay Day (1917)
 The Man Who Took a Chance (1917)
 The Clock (1917)
 The Car of Chance (1917)
 The Clean-Up (1917)
 The Beloved Traitor (1918)
 Twenty-One (1918)
 The Ghost of the Rancho (1918)
 His Birthright (1918)
 The Gray Horizon (1919)
 The Courageous Coward (1919)
 A Heart in Pawn (1919)
 His Debt (1919)
 All Wrong (1919)
 The Man Beneath (1919)
 The Dragon Painter (1919)
 Bonds of Honor (1919)
 The Illustrious Prince (1919)
 The Tong Man (1919)
 The Beggar Prince (1920)
 The Silent Barrier (1920)
 The Greater Profit (1921)
 The Unknown Wife (1921)
 The Beautiful Gambler (1921)
 Opened Shutters (1921)
 Go Straight (1921)
 Dr. Jim (1921)
 Tracked to Earth (1922)
 Out of the Silent North (1922)
 Afraid to Fight (1922)
 Kindled Courage (1923)
 The Bolted Door (1923)
 Fashionable Fakers (1923)
 Beauty and the Bad Man (1925)
 The Girl on the Stairs (1925)

See also
Multicolor

References

External links

 

1872 births
1941 deaths
American male film actors
Male actors from New York (state)
American male silent film actors
20th-century American male actors
Actors from Troy, New York
Film directors from New York (state)